The 1974–75 Copa México was the 59th staging of the Copa México, the 32nd staging in the professional.

UNAM won the final stage, for their first Copa México title.

Format
The competition is a single-elimination tournament, the group and final stage are played as home-and-away round-robin matches. All twenty Mexican Primera División teams enter in the group stage, divided into four groups of five teams. Finally, the four group stage winners advance to the final stage.

Group stage

Group 1

Group 2

Group 3

Group 4

Final stage

References

Copa MX
Football in Mexico

External links
Mexico 1974/75 at RSSSF.com